Lahugala Kota Vehera (Sinhalaː ලාහුගල කොට වෙහෙර) or Kota Vehara Raja Maha Vihara is an ancient Buddhist temple situated in Lahugala, Ampara District, Sri Lanka. The temple is located in Pansalgoda Grama Niladari division of Lahugala DS and lies on Colombo - Batticaloa main road about  far from Pothuvil town. The temple has been formally recognised by the Government as an archaeological site in Sri Lanka. The designation was declared on 10 October 2014 under the government Gazette number 1884. The protected monuments include the ancient Dagaba, building sites with stone pillars, flight of steps carved on natural rock plain and drip ledged caves. The Stupa in the Vihara has been identified as one of four Kota Vehera Styled structures found around Sri Lanka.

Kota Vehera inscriptions

Inscription no. 1

Inscription no. 2

See also
Dadigama Kota Vehera
Deliwala Kota Vehera 
Damila Maha Seya

References

Buddhist temples in Ampara District
Buddhist caves in Sri Lanka
Stupas in Sri Lanka
Archaeological protected monuments in Ampara District
Sri Lanka inscriptions